John Pringle Nichol FRSE FRAS (13 January 1804 – 19 September 1859) was a Scottish educator, phrenologist, astronomer and economist who did much to popularise astronomy in a manner that appealed to nineteenth century tastes.

Early life
Born at Huntly Hill, near Brechin, Angus, Nichol was the son of a gentleman farmer and was educated at the local grammar school and then studied mathematics and natural philosophy (physics) at King's College, University of Aberdeen. He then changed to study divinity. He was licensed as a preacher and became a highly effective communicator, but the impact of phrenological thinking led him to abandon the Church for education.

Nichol held a number of posts in education and journalism and corresponded with many leading thinkers of the times, including John Stuart Mill. He clearly made some impression in economics as James Mill and Nassau Senior nominated him as Jean-Baptiste Say's successor as professor of political economy at the Collège de France though he was at the time too ill to take the post.

Astronomy
In 1836 and in competition with Thomas Carlyle, Nichol was appointed Regius Professor of Astronomy at the University of Glasgow. He became an enthusiastic and effective lecturer and made a profound impression on William Thomson, 1st Baron Kelvin with his introduction of the "Continental" approach to mathematical physics of Jean Baptiste Joseph Fourier. He lived at the Glasgow Observatory.

Nichol turned to popular lecturing and authored a number of popular and successful books about astronomy, especially championing the nebular hypothesis. In 1841 George Eliot wrote:

William John Macquorn Rankine declared Nichol's Dictionary of the Physical Sciences to be:

Private life

In 1831 Nichol married Jane Tullis of Cupar in Fife (1813-1851).

Their eldest son, John Nichol became a literary critic and writer. Jane died in 1850. Nichol married secondly Elizabeth Pease in 1853, a prominent reformer and member of the Darlington Pease family, much against her family's wishes. His daughter, Agnes Jane Nichol, married the mathematician William Jack FRSE (1834–1924).

Nichol was a member of the Edinburgh Phrenological Society.

During the late 1840s, his health declined and, stemming from his physician's prescription, Nichol became addicted to opiates. He recorded an account of his drug-addiction illness and its cure by hydrotherapy at the Ben Rhydding Hydro in his book Memorials from Ben Rhydding (1852).

He died at Glenburn House in Rothesay but is buried in Grange Cemetery in south Edinburgh.

Notes

Bibliography
Nichol, J.P. (1837) Views of the Architecture of the Heavens, Edinburgh: William Tait
 — (1838) The Phenomena and Order of the Solar System, Edinburgh: William Tait
  (American edition, expanded with notes and glossary)
 — (1844) Contemplations on the Solar System, Edinburgh: William Tait
   
 
 
 — (1856) General Principles in Geology, the preface to Keith Johnston's Physical Atlas 2nd edition.

Obituaries
Monthly Notices of the Royal Astronomical Society, 19 (1858–9), 141; 20 (1859–60), 131;
The Times, 23 September 1859, 10b

1804 births
1859 deaths
People from Angus, Scotland
Scottish educators
Scottish astronomers
Scottish economists
19th-century Scottish writers
Alumni of the University of Aberdeen
Fellows of the Royal Society of Edinburgh
Phrenologists
19th-century British astronomers